Fynn Gutzeit (born 20 August 1990) is a German footballer who plays as a defender for SVE Comet Kiel.

Career
Gutzeit made his professional debut for Holstein Kiel in the 3. Liga on 24 March 2010, coming on as a substitute in the 84th minute for Tim Wulff in the 2–2 home draw against SpVgg Unterhaching.

Personal life
Gutzeit's father, Thorsten, is a former football and manager. He was the head coach of Holstein Kiel while Fynn was at the club from 2010 until 2013. Gutzeit's younger brother, Tjark, is also a footballer. He and Fynn have played together at Kiel, TSV Schilksee, and currently SVE Comet Kiel.

References

External links
 Profile at kicker.de
 Profile at DFB.de
 
 
 Holstein Kiel II statistics at Fussball.de
 FC Kilia Kiel statistics at Fussball.de
 SVE Comet Kiel statistics at Fussball.de

1990 births
Living people
Sportspeople from Kiel
Footballers from Schleswig-Holstein
German footballers
Association football defenders
Holstein Kiel players
Holstein Kiel II players
3. Liga players
Regionalliga players